Georg Gehring (14 November 1903 in Frankenthal – 31 October 1943 in Dnipro) was a German wrestler who competed in the 1928 Summer Olympics, in the 1932 Summer Olympics, and in the 1936 Summer Olympics. He was killed in action during World War II.

References

External links
 

1903 births
1943 deaths
Olympic wrestlers of Germany
Wrestlers at the 1928 Summer Olympics
Wrestlers at the 1932 Summer Olympics
Wrestlers at the 1936 Summer Olympics
German male sport wrestlers
Olympic bronze medalists for Germany
Olympic medalists in wrestling
Medalists at the 1928 Summer Olympics
German military personnel killed in World War II
People from Frankenthal
Sportspeople from Rhineland-Palatinate
20th-century German people